Odessa or Odesa is the third largest city in Ukraine.

Odessa may also refer to:

Places

Brazil 

 Nova Odessa

Canada 

 Odessa, Ontario
 Odessa Lake (Ontario), in Eastern Ontario
 Odessa, Saskatchewan

Ukraine 

 Odesa Oblast, the eponymous region of the third largest city in Ukraine
 Nova Odesa ("New Odessa"), a town

United States 

 Odessa, Delaware
 Odessa, Florida
 Lake Odessa, Michigan
 Odessa, Minnesota
 Odessa, Missouri
 Odessa, Nebraska
 Odessa, New York
 Odessa, Oregon
 Odessa, Texas
 Odessa, Washington
 Odessa, West Virginia
 Odessa Township (disambiguation), multiple places

People with the name

Women
Odessa (musician), American musician
Odessa Adlon (born 2000), actress
Odessa Chiklis (born 1999), daughter of Michael Chiklis
Odessa Cleveland (born 1944), American actress
Odessa Grady Clay (1917–1994), mother of Muhammad Ali
Odessa Harris, (1936–2007), American blues and jazz singer
Odessa Piper (born 1953), American restaurateur and chef
Odessa Warren Grey (1883–1960), American milliner, entrepreneur, and actress
Odessa Young (born 1998), Australian actress

Men
Odessa Sathyan (1957–2014), Indian documentary maker and activist
Odessa Turner (born 1964), American football player

Fictional characters
 Odessa Cubbage, a minor character in the game Half-Life 2
 Odessa Dobson, a character from The Spoils of Babylon
 Odessa from Into the Badlands
 Odessa (Encantadia), a character in the fantasy series Etheria
 Odessa Silverberg, a character from the video game Suikoden

Entertainment, arts

Literature 
 The Odessa File, a 1972 a thriller by Frederick Forsyth
 Odessa Stories, collection of short stories by Isaac Babel

Film or TV 
 The Odessa File (film), a 1974 film based on the 1972 book by the same name
 "Odessa", the second episode of the mini-series Heroes Reborn
 Little Odessa (film), a 1995 film directed by James Gray

Music albums 
 Odessa (Bee Gees album), 1969
 Odessa (The Handsome Family album), 1994

Songs 
 "Odessa (City on the Black Sea)", by the Bee Gees (1969)
 "Odessa", by Aesop Rock from Appleseed (1999)
 "Odessa", by Animals as Leaders from Weightless (2011)
 "Odessa", by Caribou from Swim (2010)

Other uses 
 ODESSA, a supposed organisation of former members of the Nazi SS that most historians claim is a myth
 The Odessa File, a 1972 thriller book and subsequent film written by Frederick Forsyth about a young German reporter uncovering the ODESSA organisation.
 Odessa (Wild ARMs 2), a fictional terrorist organisation from the PlayStation role-playing game Wild ARMs 2
 Odessa (yacht), Volvo Ocean 60 class
 Typhoon Odessa (1985), storm in the Pacific
 Odessa Mama (disambiguation)

See also 

 Odesa (disambiguation)
 Odesza
 Edessa (disambiguation)